Sylvia Sapira (September 26, 1908 in New York City – December 11, 1981) was an American harpsichordist who performed and recorded under the name Sylvia Marlowe.  She performed both the Baroque repertoire as well as contemporary compositions by composers such as Alan Hovhaness.

In 1957 she founded the Harpsichord Music Society, Inc. to promote new works for harpsichord and award scholarships for the advanced study of harpsichord and its repertoire. Composers commissioned by the society include Elliott Carter, Ned Rorem, Vittorio Rieti and Henri Sauguet.

Sources

References

External links
Sylvia Marlowe page
Sylvia Marlowe's Profile at The Remington Site

American harpsichordists
1908 births
1981 deaths
Musicians from New York City
20th-century classical musicians
20th-century American musicians